A hot hand is a streak of good luck in a sport or gambling.

Hot hand or Hot hands may also refer to:

 Hot Hand (pinball), poker-based pinball machine
 Red hands, or Hot hands, a game in which two players try to slap each other's hands